Tenri University Corporation (学校法人天理大学 Gakkō hōjin Tenri daigaku) manages the education system of Tenrikyo Church Headquarters. The corporation supervises Tenri Kindergarten, Tenri Elementary School, Tenri Middle School, Tenri High School (I and II), Tenri University, Tenri Central Library, Tenri University Sankōkan Museum, and the Oyasato Institute for the Study of Religion.

See also
Official website

Tenrikyo
School Corporations in Japan